The 1951 All-Pro Team consisted of American football players chosen by various selectors for the All-Pro team of the National Football League (NFL) for the 1951 NFL season. Teams were selected by, among others, the Associated Press (AP) (chosen in a national poll of AP football writers), the United Press (UP) (selected by UP sports writers), and the New York Daily News.

The All-Pro selections were dominated by players from the Cleveland Browns (nine first-team honorees including Otto Graham and Lou Groza), New York Giants (seven honorees including Emlen Tunnell), Los Angeles Rams (six first-team honorees including Elroy Hirsch), and Detroit Lions (four first-team honorees including Doak Walker).

This was the first year that separate defensive and offensive teams were selected as up until this point most players had played both ways for much of the game (although this had decreased in the later 1940s), so a quarterback/tailback/ halfback on offense usually just became a defensive back similar to today's safety when playing defense while the fullback, usually a larger player, or a larger halfback (and before the T-formation, the quarterback, who was usually actually a blocking back on offence), would play a position similar to linebacker.  Ends would also usually convert to defensive backs, similar to corner backs of today.

Selections

References

All-Pro Teams
1951 National Football League season